Jesse Lipscombe (born 1980) is a Canadian actor. He won a Rosie Award for Best Performance by an Alberta Actor for his performance in the 2017 film, It's Not My Fault and I Don't Care Anyway.  and was one of the executive producers of the sketch comedy show Tiny Plastic Men for which he was nominated for a Canadian Screen Award for Best Comedy Series at the 3rd Canadian Screen Awards. Lipscombe is also the founder of the #MakeitAwkward campaign, a hashtag movement in Edmonton that promotes anti-racism.

Early life
Lipscombe was born in West Edmonton, Alberta to mother Monica (née Miles) Lipscombe and father Richard Lipscombe. He was raised in St. Albert.

Personal life
Lipscombe is married to Julia LeConte Lipscombe. They have three sons. As of October 2018, they reside in Queen Mary Park, Edmonton.

Lipscombe is also the grandson of Edmonton Elks football player Rollie Miles.

Select filmography
Children of the Dust (1995)
 Resurrecting the Champ (2007)
 Lloyd the Conqueror (2011)
 Mutant World (2014)
 It's Not My Fault and I Don't Care Anyway (2017)
 #Roxy (2018)
 In Plainview (2018)
 Black Summer (2021)
 Jonesin'  (2021)

References

External links
 

Living people
Black Canadian male actors
Canadian male film actors
Canadian male television actors
Canadian people of African-American descent
Male actors from Edmonton
21st-century Canadian male actors
20th-century Canadian male actors
1980 births